The Ethiopian Zion Coptic Church is a movement born in Jamaica in the 1950s by disciples of Marcus Garvey and was incorporated in Florida in 1975. It first established its organization in the United States in Star Island, Florida with a commune of around 40 members. The commune followed a combination of teachings from the Bible, Old and New Testament, Billy Graham's fundamentalism, and Kosher law. The movement understands and confirms that it is based on the teachings of Marcus Garvey and that they use cannabis as sacrament. It is a misconception that pious Rastafarians smoke marijuana recreationally, and some (in particular, the canonical Ethiopian Orthodox and classical Elders) do not use it at all. However, many Rastafarian teachers have advocated for controlled ritual smoking of 'wisdom weed' in private as a meditation tool and communally from 'chalice' pipes as an 'incense to please the Lord.'

In 1979 the group was accused, tried, and convicted of smuggling massive amounts of potent cannabis from Jamaica to Miami in actions that kept the Jamaican economy afloat that decade. The then-Jamaican Prime Minister Edward Seaga told a U.S. interview "It's just a little sinsemilla that it keep the country going right now". The Coptics published a free newspaper promoting Garveyism and the decriminalization of marijuana titled "Coptic Times". They also appeared on 60 Minutes on October 28, 1979. The group's leader was Thomas Reilly, also known as Brother Louv. During the same year, The Supreme Court of Florida found: "(1) the Ethiopian Zion Coptic Church represents a religion within the first amendment to the Constitution of the United States, and (2) the “use of cannabis is an essential portion of the religious practice." "Further, the Ethiopian Zion Coptic Church is not a new church or religion but the record reflects it is centuries old and has regularly used cannabis as its sacrament”.

In 1986 the organization participated in the Drug Enforcement Administration's hearings on cannabis rescheduling in the United States.

On January 19, 2017 Jim Tranmer, a member of the group, was pardoned and released from prison by Barack Obama before he left the office of the President of the United States. Tramner had received a 33 year prison sentence  for possession of cannabis because he defended the sacramentality and goodness of cannabis without repentance.  Today many are grateful for his sacrifice and his release is an acknowledgement in the paradigm change that has taken place since the majority of the population now see that to fight against a medicinal plant is a detrimental social policy.  

Olsen ran for governor in Iowa, as a Libertarian, in 1994 and for the U.S. House of Representatives, again as a Libertarian, in 1996.  He is currently a priest in the Ethiopian Zion Coptic Church, and resides in Iowa.

The EZCC is not associated with either the Coptic Orthodox Church or the Coptic Catholic Church, both based in Egypt. The Coptic Orthodox Church has an Ethiopian sister church, which is also unrelated. The Garveyite Coptic were most closely tied to the African Orthodox Church than to Egypt. The EZCC gets its namesake from a 1959 mission to Ethiopia in which the archbishop brought a group of young Ethiopian priests and deacons to study in American universities. However, the clergy cut ties with the Garveyite Coptic organization in New York and set up its own parishes that addressed the needs of Ethiopian immigrants.

The Zion Coptic Church appeared in the 2011 Billy Corben documentary Square Grouper: The Godfathers of Ganja, whose first section concerns the group and features interviews with former members.
In Brazil there are the First Niubingui Church Etiope Coptic of Zion of Brasil.

References

History of the Ethiopian Zion Coptic Church, by Walter Wells.
The Law and Brother Louv, The Miami Herald, August 2, 1981
Ethiopian Zion Coptic Church, CBS News - 60 Minutes, Volume XII, Number 7, Oct. 28, 1979.

Religious organizations using entheogens
Rastafari
Cannabis and religion
Cannabis trafficking
Religion in Jamaica
Religion in Florida
Cannabis in Jamaica
Cannabis in Florida